Anna Maria Weems, also Ann Maria Weems (ca. 1840 – after 1863), whose aliases included "Ellen Capron" and "Joe Wright," was an American woman known for escaping slavery by disguising herself as a male carriage driver and escaping to Canada, where her family was settled with other slave fugitives.

She and her younger sister were separated from her family at the age of seven, and her mother and brothers were sold in Alabama. Within a few months, her mother and two of her youngest brothers were manumitted and settled with their father in Washington, D.C. Then freedom for her sister, Catherine, was negotiated. The Weems had attained the money to pay ransoms through abolitionists in England and the United States. Unable to purchase Anna Maria Weems' freedom, she ran away at the age of 15. She left her slaveholder in Rockville, Maryland and traveled through Philadelphia, Washington, D.C. and Brooklyn, New York before arriving in Dresden, Ontario. The journey, made more treacherous due to the Fugitive Slave Act of 1850, occurred over two months, six weeks of which she was in hiding and most of which she was dressed as a young man.

Three books have been written about Weems and her family member's struggle for freedom, entitled A Shadow on the Household, Stealing Freedom and The Underground Railroad: Anna Maria Weems.

Early life and pre-escape 
Anna Maria Weems was born in Maryland around 1840 to John, a freeman, and Arabella Talbot Weems, an enslaved woman owned by Adam Robb. Her mother was described as a woman of "superior culture and endowments". Arabella's mother, Cecelia Talbot, was also owned by Robb. They all lived in Montgomery County where Robb owned and operated a tavern and an inn.

Rare for an enslaved woman, Arabella married John on March 1, 1829, at the St. Mary's Roman Catholic Church in Rockville, Maryland. John, who worked on a small farm, purchased his freedom before their wedding and had Robb's promise that he could purchase his wife and children at "a reasonable price". Robb allowed the family to live together at times.

Over the course of their marriage, John and Arabella Weems had four daughters and six sons: Mary Jane (Stella), Catherine Ann, William Augustus, Thomas Richard (Dick), Charles Adam (Addison), Anna Maria, Joseph, John Lewis, Sylvester, and Mary. All of their children, except the youngest, Mary, were born into slavery. Arabella was a free woman when Mary was born. Anna Maria Weems was baptized at St. Mary's.

Robb died in 1847 when Weems was about five or seven years old. Robb's slaves were divided between his two daughters, Jane Robb Beall and Catherine Robb Harding. The latter daughter received Weems, her siblings and Weems' mother, but was deeply in debt, so she and her husband, Henry Harding, prepared to sell off slaves to salvage their financial situation. John tried to raise money to buy his family members, but was not able to do so before his family was divided. Harding sold them to slave traders who placed two daughters in a slave pen and held Arabella and her sons in a Washington jail before they were sold and sent to Alabama in the Deep South. Weems and her sister Catherine were sold to Charles M. Price, a slave trader in Unity, Maryland. William Still described Charles Price as having been "given to 'intemperance,' to a very great extent, and gross 'profanity'" and added that his wife, Caroline, "is cross and peevish."

In 1849 or 1850, abolitionist William L. Chaplin helped their eldest daughter, Mary Jane, and Arabella's sister Annie and her family escape. Mary Jane went to Geneva, New York, where she was adopted by Henry Highland Garnet, a former slave and an abolitionist. The three subsequently changed their names. Mary Jane became Stella. Her aunt and uncle took the names Annie Bradley and William Henry Bradley. Stella moved with the Garnets to Jamaica in the West Indies in November 1852. In 1850, Arabella was pregnant with their ninth child. Around that time, their fourth child, Richard, appears to have died.

Having heard that the Weems family would likely be sold to different owners, the Weems Family Ransom Fund was created mostly from donations made by Henry and Anna Richardson, Quaker abolitionists from England. with the objective to help John buy Arabella and their children's freedom. More than $5,000 was raised. Jacob Bigelow, a lawyer from Washington, D.C., negotiated to buy the freedom of Arabella and two of the boys for $1,600 after a few months. John, Arabella, and the two boys settled in Washington, D.C. Their daughter Catherine was freed after paying a $1,000 or $1,600 ransom and she accepted a position in Washington, D.C. There was not enough remaining money in the fund for an offer that Price would accept to sell Anna Maria; For years, the Prices rejected any offers by Bigelow to sell Weems, getting up to $700 at one point. When she was 10 or 15 years old, Weems had to sleep in the Price's bedroom to prevent her escape.

Escape 
For more than two years, Weems planned her escape from the Prices. Bigelow helped plan her escape with William Still, a conductor on the Underground Railroad and from the Philadelphia Vigilance Committee and Rev. Charles Bennett Ray of the New York Vigilance Committee. Conductors, like Still, aided fugitives in their travel between Underground Railroad stations, where they would get food and sleep before moving on to the next station. The trip would be very dangerous for her and those who helped her, even moreso after the passage of the Fugitive Slave Act of 1850, which meant staying in Washington with her family or other places in the United States was very dangerous. So the goal was to escort her to the settlement in Dresden, Ontario, Canada where her aunt and uncle found safety.

At the age of 15, Weems escaped the Price household in Rockville and embarked on a 15-mile journey to Washington, D.C. on September 23, 1855. She may have stayed with family members in the city for a while before meeting up with Bigelow, who was an Underground Railroad conductor. An ad was posted in the newspaper about her escape and offered a $500 ransom. She was described as "A bright mulatoo, some small freckles on her face; slender person, thick suit of hair, inclined to be sandy".

Due to the amount of the ransom, Weems was sequestered in Bigelow's house for six weeks. They organized a plan to disguise Weems as "Mr. Joe Wright", a male carriage driver, in a driver's uniform, cap and a bow tie. She was also taught how to carry herself like a young man.

Bigelow's white physician, Dr. Ellwood Harvey ("Dr. H.") of the Woman's Medical College of Pennsylvania, helped her escape the city by driving his carriage to the White House, where he met up with Weems had been escorted by Bigelow. Weems took the driver's seat and drove out of Washington, D.C. Along the way, they came upon both a toll gate operator and a ferry operator who questioned whether to provide them passage. They stopped along a several day leg of her journey, during which they stayed at Dr. H's friend's homes, who were slaveholders. He managed jokes that "Joe" might be a runaway and then claimed to have dizzy spells that required "Joe" to sleep in his room, which provided safety for Weems. On their second day, Harvey managed a disturbance by several men who tried to stop them after crossing the Susquehanna River. They made it to William Still's house in Pennsylvania on November 22, 1855, where a photograph was taken of her in disguise for her mother. In his station report for the Underground Railroad, he described Weems: "She is about fifteen years of age, bright mulatto, well grown, smart, and good-looking."

Weems stayed at the Still's house several days before she was then taken to New York. On November 28, she was escorted by Rev. Charles Bennett Ray to meet abolitionist Lewis Tappan and his wife, Sarah Tappan, in Brooklyn. She stayed for several days, during which Sarah purchased new clothes for her, using $63 from the Weems Ransom Fund. The clothes were appropriate for the Canadian weather.

She was then taken to the home of Rev. Amos N. Freeman, minister of the Siloam Presbyterian Church in Brooklyn. At the Freeman's house, "she received quite an ovation characteristic of the Underground Rail Road". Freeman took Weems to Canada by train, traveling through Rochester, New York and Niagara Falls. Once in Canada, they traveled by train to Chatham. From there, they were taken to by carriage to the Dawn settlement for former slaves in Dresden, Ontario, Canada where her aunt and uncle, William Henry and Ann Bradley, had escaped to as slaves. The Bradleys selected these new first names after gaining their freedom. The journey ended in December 1855, two months after it began.

Free life and death 

Under her aunt and uncle's leadership, she was educated at Buxton Mission at the Elgin Settlement (now Buxton National Historic Site and Museum), twelve miles south of Chatham, Ontario, was one of four settlements established in Canada for black people.

The 9,000-acre settlement was located between Lake Erie and the Great Western Railway line. It provided education through the Buxton Mission School and religious services to its residents, most of whom had been enslaved. The land was divided into many 50-acre farms that could be paid for in installments over ten years. There was a brick-making plant, general store, grist mill, and a saw mill. The community grew to include a hotel, the Buxton post office, and a number of businesses. In 1856, there were 120 students who attended the mission school. The quality of the education afforded at the school is said to have made it "the most successful black settlement in North America." The local school for white children was closed and children transferred to the school at Buxton to improve their education. Students went on to enter politics, found the Freedmen's Hospital in Washington, D.C., and become teachers, doctors, and missionaries.

She settled at Buxton. John and Arabella had a daughter, Mary, who was born free about 1855. They were able to reunite with their other children; the remaining two sons, James and Addison, who were enslaved were bought with money from the Weems Family Ransom Fund by August 1858. Weems' mother said at the time in which her last child was freed, "I am expecting daily the return of Augustus, and may Heaven grant him a safe deliverance and smile propitiously upon you and all kind friends who have aided in his return to me." John and Arabella moved to the Dawn settlement in 1861 with their two youngest children, just before the start of the Civil War. They stayed there for nine years before returning to the District of Columbia, where John, Arabella, their son John, and daughter Mary were living by June 1870.

Significance 
Historians such as Stanley Harrold have stated that the importance of gender is significant to the case of Weems, as her disguise is what allowed her escape to be successful. He also argues that this case also "suggests that a number of aspects of the underground railroad remain worthy of investigation" such as the international and interracial cooperation between abolitionists and that this would help historians understand why all persons involved continued to help regardless of the potential consequences of being caught.

Notes

References

Further reading

External links
 Ann Maria Weems, YouTube
 Jenny Masur: Heroes of the Underground Railroad Around Washington, DC, YouTube

Fugitive American slaves
1840 births
Year of death unknown
People from Montgomery County, Maryland
Fugitive American slaves that reached Canada